Metro Area is the self-titled debut studio album by American house music group Metro Area, released on October 22, 2002. It was named the second best album of the decade by Resident Advisor. Fact magazine rated it as the nineteenth best album of the decade.

Track listing
"Intro" (Geist, Jesrani) – 0:32
"Dance Reaction" (Geist, Jesrani) – 6:11
"Miura" (Geist, Jesrani) – 6:42
"Piña" (Geist, Jesrani) – 6:05
"Square-Pattern Aura" (Geist, Jesrani) – 5:36
"Machine Vibes" (Geist, Jesrani) – 5:39
"Atmosphrique" (Geist, Jesrani) – 6:32
"Soft Hoop" (Geist, Jesrani) – 4:47
"Let's Get" (Geist, Jesrani) - 6:24
"Orange Alert" (Geist, Jesrani) – 5:39
"Strut" (Geist, Jesrani) – 5:34
"Caught Up" (Geist, Jesrani) – 7:37

Personnel
 Ana Dane – flute
 James Duncan – horn
 Morgan Geist – producer
 Darshan Jesrani – producer
 Kelley Polar – strings
 Jamie Krents – bass
 Dei Lewison – vocals, vox organ
 Dan Selzer – design
 Dee Silk – guitar
 Itis Tandoor – percussion

References

2002 debut albums
Metro Area albums